Antonin Fleischer (17 February 1850 – 22 October 1934) was a Czech physician and entomologist who specialized in beetles.

Fleischer was born in a family with a clergy tradition. His brother Bohumil became a pastor while another, Josef, also became a physician and entomologist. Fleischer studied at the grammar school in Těšín and then went to study medicine in Vienna and Prague where he received an MD in 1875. He then began practice at a maternity hospital in Brno. In 1878 he worked in the military service and after 1880 stated a private practice. He worked in the Moravian Health Council from 1891 as well as in Vienna from 1909. In 1910 he received a Knight's Cross from František Josef. Fleischer was interested in beetles from a young age, being influenced by Edmund Reitter at school. While studying in Prague he worked at the zoological collections and went on collection trips with E. Lokaj, K. Skalitzsky, J. Stussiner and others. In 1873 he was involved in an entomological exhibit at the World's Fair in Vienna of 1873. His collection of nearly 30.000 specimens including the types of species described by him were purchased by the National Museum, Prague in 1935.

References 

Czech entomologists
1850 births
1934 deaths